Pão-por-Deus ("Bread for God") is the Portuguese tradition of souling celebrated all over Portugal, named for the soulmass-cakes given to the poor on All Saints Day, typically by children and youth. Names for the custom vary through different regions of the country, for instance, around Leiria it is known as "Dia do Bolinho" ("Cookie Day").

Origins 
There are records of the day of Pão-de-Deus in the 15th century. On 1 November 1755 in Lisbon, after the vast majority of the city's residents lost everything to the Great Lisbon earthquake the survivors had to ask for this bread in the neighbouring towns.

Customs 
From early in the morning (8 or 9 am) children meet together and walk around the neighborhood, knock at all doors and local stores and say "Pão-por-Deus" to the adults they meet.

People at home give them small gifts such as broas (small bread-like cakes flavored heavily with anise and nuts), chocolates, candy, nuts, fruit, or in some cases, money.

At the local stores, the offers are different. A store may give the children treats or a sample of a product they sell: bakers give a little bread, fruit stalls give some chestnuts, and so on.

In the Azores, the children are given a cake called "caspiada" during this ritual begging. The cakes have the shape of the top of a skull.

The Pão-de-Deus or Santoro is the bread, or offering, that is given to the dead, the Molete or Samagaio (also called sabatina, raiva da criança (child's rage)) is the bread, or offering, that is given when a child is born.

Rhyme

See also
Culture of Portugal
Soul cake
Allerheiligenstriezel

References

Portuguese traditions
Halloween food